The Menace is a 1928 Australian silent film about the drug trade in Sydney. It is considered a lost film.

Production
Sydney businessman Percy Juchau formed a film company in August 1926. It employed five people who had experience working in Hollywood – director Cyril Sharpe, camera technician Al True, crew members Al True and Eric Wilkinson, and Louise Miller. This was the only movie they made.

It was shot in late 1926 and early 1927 at the Sydney Showground.

Release
The film was previewed but not released commercially. It was viewed by a film critic from the Sydney Morning Herald who criticised it for "unhealthy sensationalism".

After filming, Cyril Sharpe left Juchau and became managing director of Commonwealth Film Laboratories in Sydney, with Jack Bruce as his chief technician.

References

External links

The Menace at National Film and Sound Archive

1928 films
Australian drama films
Australian silent feature films
Australian black-and-white films
1928 drama films
Lost Australian films
1928 lost films
Lost drama films
Silent drama films